Jorge Filipe Pereira Neves (born 17 September 1987 in Fátima) is a Portuguese footballer who plays as a midfielder.

External links

1987 births
Living people
Portuguese footballers
Association football midfielders
Liga Portugal 2 players
Segunda Divisão players
C.D. Fátima players
U.D. Leiria players
Cypriot Second Division players
Anagennisi Deryneia FC players
Othellos Athienou F.C. players
Portuguese expatriate footballers
Expatriate footballers in Cyprus
Portuguese expatriate sportspeople in Cyprus